Richard Millman (1932–1983) was an American historian at the University of Illinois.

Millman was appointed instructor at Temple University for 1960–1961.

His 1979 work on Benjamin Disraeli's policy during the Great Eastern Crisis of 1875–78 (Britain and the Eastern Question) was called the "authoritative account" by M. R. D. Foot and a "masterly achievement" by John Vincent. According to Richard Shannon, Millman "challenges the Seton-Watsonian tradition and boldly essays to restore the credibility of Disraeli's attempt to reassert the Palmerstonian tradition of maintaining the independence and integrity of the Ottoman Empire as a capital British interest".

Works
British Foreign Policy and the Coming of the Franco-Prussian War (Oxford: Clarendon Press, 1965). 
Britain and the Eastern Question, 1875-1878 (Oxford: Clarendon Press, 1979). 
'The Bulgarian Massacres Reconsidered', The Slavonic and East European Review, Vol. 58, No. 2 (Apr., 1980), pp. 218–231.

Notes

1932 births
1983 deaths
University of Illinois Chicago faculty
20th-century American historians